A genocide of Yazidis by the Islamic State was carried out in the Sinjar area of northern Iraq in the mid-2010s. The genocide led to the expulsion, flight and effective exile of the Yazidis. Thousands of Yazidi women and girls were forced into sexual slavery by ISIL, and thousands of Yazidi men were killed. About 5,000 Yazidi civilians were killed during what has been called a "forced conversion campaign" carried out by ISIL in Northern Iraq. The genocide began after the withdrawal of Iraqi forces and Peshmerga, which left the Yazidis defenseless.

ISIL's persecution of the Yazidis gained international attention and led to the American-led intervention in Iraq, which started with United States airstrikes against ISIL. Additionally, the US, UK, and Australia made emergency airdrops to Yazidis who had fled to a mountain range. YPG and PKK fighters opened a humanitarian corridor to the Sinjar Mountains and helped the Yazidis. By 2015, ISIL's actions against the Yazidi population had resulted in approximately 500,000 refugees.

The genocide has been recognized by several bodies of the United Nations  and national and multi-national organizations.

Background 
The Yazidis are monotheists who believe in Melek Taus, a benevolent angel who appears as a peacock. The self-proclaimed Islamic State of Iraq and the Levant and other Muslims in the region tend to view the peacock angel as the malevolent creature Lucifer or Shaitan and they consider the Yazidis 'devil worshippers'. Unlike for Judaism and Christianity, ISIL does not consider Yazidis as People of the book or eligible for Dhimmi and related protections.

In August 2014, more than 300 Yazidi families were threatened and forced to choose between conversion to Sunni Islam or death.

Previous targeting of Yazidis

Ottoman era 
 In 1640, 40,000 Ottoman soldiers attacked Yazidi communities around Mount Sinjar, killing 3,060 Yazidis during battle, then raiding and setting fire to 300 Yazidi villages and murdering 1,000–2,000 Yazidis who had taken refuge in caves around the town of Sinjar;
 in 1892, Sultan Abdulhamid II ordered a campaign of mass conscription or murder of Yazidis as part of his campaign to Islamize the Ottoman Empire, which also targeted Armenians and other Christians.

Post 2003 Iraq invasion era 

 In April 2007, a bus in Mosul was hijacked. Muslims and Christians were told to get off, while the remaining 23 Yazidi passengers were driven to an eastern Mosul location and murdered.
 In August 2007, two Yazidi communities, in Qahtaniyah (just south of Sinjar) and Jazeera (Siba Sheikh Khidir), near Mosul, were hit by a total of four vehicle bombs carrying two tons of explosives, leaving 336–500 dead and 1,500 injured. Perpetrators are unknown; the U.S. saw "al-Qaeda as the prime suspect" because of the scale and the co-ordinated nature of the bombings.

Outbreak of violence 

On 3 August 2014, ISIL militants attacked and took over Sinjar in northern Iraq, a Kurdish-controlled town that was predominantly inhabited by Yazidis, and the surrounding area.

Yazidis, and internet postings of ISIL, have reported summary executions that day by ISIL militants, leading to 200,000 civilians fleeing Sinjar, of whom around 50,000 Yazidis were reportedly escaping to the nearby Sinjar Mountains. They were trapped on Mount Sinjar, surrounded by ISIL militants and facing starvation and dehydration.

On 4 August 2014, Prince Tahseen Said, Emir of the Yazidi, issued a plea to world leaders calling for assistance on behalf of the Yazidi facing attack from ISIL.

Massacres 

On 3 August 2014, ISIL killed the men from the al-Qahtaniya area, ten Yazidi families fleeing were attacked by ISIL; and ISIL shot 70 to 90 Yazidi men in Qiniyeh village.

On 4 August, ISIL fighters attacked Jabal Sinjar, and killed 30 Yazidi men; 60 more Yazidi men were killed in the village of Hardan. On the same day, Yazidi community leaders stated that at least 200 Yazidis had been killed in Sinjar (see Sinjar massacre), and 60–70 near Ramadi Jabal.
According to reports from surviving Yazidis, between 3 and 6 August, more than 50 Yazidi were killed near Dhola village, 100 in Khana Sor village, 250–300 in Hardan area, more than 200 on the road between Adnaniya and Jazeera, dozens near al-Shimal village, and on the road from Matu village to Jabal Sinjar.

On 10 August, according to statements by the Iraqi government, ISIL militants buried alive an undefined number of Yazidi women and children in northern Iraq in an attack that killed 500 people.
Those who escaped across the Tigris River into Kurdish-controlled areas of Syria on 10 August gave accounts of how they had seen individuals also attempting to flee who later died.

On 15 August, in the Yazidi village of Kojo, south of Sinjar, after the whole population had received the jihadist ultimatum to convert or be killed, over 80 men were killed.
A witness recounted that the villagers were first converted under duress, but when the village elder refused to convert, all of the men were taken in trucks under the pretext of being led to Sinjar and gunned down along the way.
According to reports from survivors interviewed by OHCHR, on 15 August, the entire male population of the Yazidi village of Khocho, up to 400 men, were rounded up and shot by ISIL, and up to 1,000 women and children were abducted; on the same day, up to 200 Yazidi men were reportedly executed for refusing conversion in a Tal Afar prison.

Between 24 and 25 August 14 elderly Yazidi men were executed by ISIL in the Sheikh Mand Shrine, and the Jidala village Yazidi shrine was blown up. On 1 September, the Yazidi villages of Kotan, Hareko and Kharag Shafrsky were set afire by ISIL, and on 9 September, Peshmerga fighters discovered a mass grave containing the bodies of 14 executed civilians, presumably Yazidis.

According to an OHRCR/UNAMI report on 26 September, by the end of August, 1,600–1,800 or more Yazidis who had been murdered, executed, or died from starvation.
In early October, Matthew Barber, a scholar of Yazidi history at the University of Chicago, estimated that 5,000 Yazidi men had been killed by ISIL.

According to the United Nations, ISIL had massacred 5,000 Yazidi men and kidnapped about 7000 Yazidi women and girls (who were forced into sex slavery) in northern Iraq in August 2014.

In May 2015, the Yazidi Progress Party released a statement in which they said that 300 Yazidi captives were killed on 1 May by ISIL in the Tal Afar, Iraq.

A 2017 survey by the PLOS Medicine journal significantly decreased the number of Yazidis killed however concurrently raised the number abducted with 2,100 to 4,400 deaths and 4,200 to 10,800 abductions.

Sunni collaboration 
In several villages, local Sunnis were reported to have sided with ISIL, betraying Yazidis for slaughter once ISIL arrived, and even possibly colluding in advance with ISIL to lie to Yazidis, to lure them into staying put until the terrorists invaded, although there was also one report of Sunnis helping Yazidis to escape.

Sexual slavery and reproductive violence 

The 2017 report of the United Nations Secretary-General on conflict-related sexual violence detailed the brutal attacks on Mosul, Sinjar, Tall’Afar, and the Ninewa plains in the north and subjection of civilians to sexual violence on a horrific scale primarily against women and girls from ethnic and religious minority groups. According to declarations, 971 Yazidi women and girls have been freed while 1,882 remained enslaved in Iraq and Syria. Forced transfer of Yazidis from Mosul to Raqqah (Syria), trafficking, the sale and trade of women and children, and the use of sexually enslaved women as human shields by ISIL during the Mosul operations were also reported.

Abductions 
On 3 August, ISIL abducted women and children from the al-Qahtaniya area, and 450–500 abducted Yazidi women and girls were taken to Tal Afar; hundreds more to Si Basha Khidri and then Ba'aj. When ISIL fighters attacked Jabal Sinjar on 4 August, they abducted a number of women in the Yazidi village of Hardan, wives and daughters were abducted; other Yazidi women were abducted in other villages in the area. On 6 August, ISIL kidnapped 400 Yazidi women in Sinjar to sell them as sex slaves. According to reports from surviving Yazidi, between 3 and 6 August 500 Yazidi women and children were abducted from Ba'aj and more than 200 from Tal Banat. According to a statement by the Iraqi government on 10 August 2014, hundreds of women were taken as slaves in northern Iraq. On 15 August, in the Yazidi village of Kojo, south of Sinjar, over 100 women were abducted, though according to some reports from survivors, up to 1,000 women and children of the Yazidi village of Khocho were abducted. According to an OHRCR/UNAMI report on 26 September, by the end of August up to 2,500 Yazidis, mostly women and children, had been abducted.
In early October, Matthew Barber, a scholar of Yazidi history at the University of Chicago, compiled a list of names of 4,800 Yazidi women and children who had been captured (estimating the total number of abducted people to be possibly up to 7,000).

The abducted Yazidi women were sold into slave markets with ISIL "using rape as a weapon of war" according to CNN, with the group having gynaecologists ready to examine the captives. Yazidi women were physically observed, including examinations to see if they were virgins or if they were pregnant. Women who were found to be pregnant were taken by the ISIL gynaecologists and forced abortions were performed on them.

Treatment 
Haleh Esfandiari from the Woodrow Wilson International Center for Scholars highlighted the abuse of local women by ISIL militants after they have captured an area. "They usually take the older women to a makeshift slave market and try to sell them. The younger girls ... are raped or married off to fighters", she said, adding, "It's based on temporary marriages, and once these fighters have had sex with these young girls, they just pass them on to other fighters."

Speaking of Yazidi women captured by ISIL, Nazand Begikhani said in October 2014, "These women have been treated like cattle ... They have been subjected to physical and sexual violence, including systematic rape and sex slavery. They've been exposed in markets in Mosul and in Raqqa, Syria, carrying price tags." Yazidi girls in Iraq allegedly raped by ISIL fighters have committed suicide by jumping to their death from Mount Sinjar, as described in a witness statement.

A United Nations report issued on 2 October 2014, based on 500 interviews with witnesses, said that ISIL took 450–500 women and girls to Iraq's Nineveh region in August where "150 unmarried girls and women, predominantly from the Yazidi and Christian communities, were reportedly transported to Syria, either to be enslaved to ISIL fighters as a 'reward' or to be sold as sex slaves".
Also in October 2014, a UN report revealed that ISIL had detained 5,000 to 7,000 Yazidi women as slaves or forced brides in northern Iraq in August 2014.

On 4 November 2014, Dr. Widad Akrawi of Defend International said that "the international community should define what's happening to the Yezidis as a crime against humanity, crime against cultural heritage of the region and ethnic cleansing", adding that Yazidi females are being "subjected to as systematic gender-based violence and the use of slavery and rape as a weapon of war."
A month earlier, President of Defend International dedicated her 2014 International Pfeffer Peace Award to the Yazidis, Christians and all residents of Kobane because, she said, facts on the ground demonstrate that these peaceful people are not safe in their enclaves, partly because of their ethnic origin and/or religion and they are therefore in urgent need for immediate attention from the global community. She asked the international community to make sure that the victims are not forgotten; they should be rescued, protected, fully assisted and compensated fairly.

In June 2017, reports from Vian Dakhil of the Iraqi parliament told of a captured sex slave being fed her own one-year-old child. The woman was starved for three days in a cellar and was finally given a meal by her captors. When finished, they said "We cooked your one-year-old son that we took from you, and this is what you just ate".

Selling process 
On 3 November 2014, the "price list" for Yazidi and Christian females issued by ISIL surfaced online, and Dr. Widad Akrawi and her team were the first to verify the authenticity of the document. On 4 November 2014, a translated version of the document was shared by Akrawi. On 4 August 2015, the same document was confirmed as genuine by a UN official.

Writing in mid 2016, Lori Hinnant, Maya Alleruzzo and Balint Szlanko of the Associated Press report that ISIL tightened "its grip on the estimated 3,000 women and girls held as sex slaves" even while it was losing territory to Iraqi forces. ISIL sells the women on encrypted smart phone apps, "primarily on Telegram and on Facebook" and to a lesser degree on WhatsApp. In advertisements for the girls seen by AP,

many of the women and girls are dressed in finery, some in heavy makeup. All look directly at the camera, standing in front of overstuffed chairs or brocade curtains in what resembles a shabby hotel ballroom. Some are barely out of elementary school. Not one looks older than 30.

Reproductive violence 
Various forms of reproductive violence were enacted against the Yazidi women and children to prevent birth. Captured Yazidis were taken as slaves and forced to use contraceptive pills and injections, and those captured pregnant were victims of forced abortions. Reports covered that Yazidi women and girls were told that they had to abort their previous unborn children since ISIL fighters were interested only in making Muslim babies. Forced impregnation with the intent to prevent the birth of Yazidi babies is also another form of reproductive violence and a measure taken against the group. These destructive intents and acts are described as preventing future procreation and causing severe long-term physical, psychological, and socio-political effects.

Escape 
Since 2014, efforts have been ongoing to rescue those enslaved by the Islamic State, including paying ransoms. Many were freed by the Syrian Democratic Forces as they took territory from the Islamic State in the Rojava-Islamist conflict. In November 2014 The New York Times reported on the accounts given by five who escaped the Islamic State of their captivity and abuse.

According to Mirza Dinnayi, founder of the German-Iraqi aid organization Luftbrücke Irak, ISIL registers "every slave, every person under their owner, and therefore if she escapes, every Daesh [ISIL] control or checkpoint, or security force - they know that this girl ... has escaped from this owner".
For over a year after the girls were first enslaved, "Arab and Kurdish smugglers managed to free an average of 134" slaves a month. But by May 2016, an ISIL "crackdown reduced those numbers to just 39 in the last six weeks, according to figures provided by the Kurdistan regional government". ISIL fighters targeted and killed "smugglers who rescue the captives". In 2016, funds provided by the Kurdistan Regional Government to buy the women out of slavery were cut off as a result of the collapse in the price of oil and disputes with Iraq's central government over revenues.

The freeing of Yazidi women continues, with some being found at the homes of Islamic State commanders in Ankara in July 2020. One seven-year old Yazidi girl was rescued from two ISIS commanders in Ankara by Turkish authorities in February 2021.

ISIL's beliefs 
In its digital magazine Dabiq, ISIL explicitly claimed religious justification for enslaving Yazidi women. ISIL's religious justifications were refuted by mainstream Islamic scholars.

According to The Wall Street Journal, ISIL appeals to apocalyptic beliefs and claims "justification by a Hadith that they interpret as portraying the revival of slavery as a precursor to the end of the world". In late 2014, ISIL released a pamphlet on the treatment of female slaves. The New York Times said in August 2015 that "[t]he systematic rape of women and girls from the Yazidi religious minority has become deeply enmeshed in the organization and the radical theology of the Islamic State in the year since the group announced it was reviving slavery as an institution."

Forced exile

Flight into the Sinjar Mountains and the PKK's support 

The ISIL offensive in the Sinjar area of northern Iraq, 3–4 August, caused 30,000–50,000 Yazidis to flee into the Sinjar Mountains (Jabal Sinjar) fearing they would be killed by ISIL. They had been threatened with death if they refused conversion to Islam. A UN representative said that "a humanitarian tragedy is unfolding in Sinjar".

On 3 and 4 August 14 or more, Yazidi children and some elderly or people with disabilities died of hunger, dehydration, and heat on Mount Sinjar. By 6 August, according to reports from survivors, 200 Yazidi children while fleeing to Mount Sinjar had died from thirst, starvation, heat and dehydration.

Fifty thousand Yazidis, besieged by ISIL on Mount Sinjar, were able to escape after Kurdish People's Protection Units and PKK broke ISIL siege on the mountains. The majority of them were rescued by Kurdish PKK and YPG fighters. Multinational rescue operation involved dropping of supplies on the mountains and evacuation of some refugees by helicopters. During the rescue operation, on 12 August, an overloaded Iraqi Air Force helicopter crashed on Mount Sinjar, killing Iraqi Air Force Major General Majid Ahmed Saadi (the pilot) and injuring 20 people.

On 8 August, PKK provided humanitarian aid and camps to more than 3,000 Yazidi refugees.

By 20 October, 2,000 Yazidis, mainly volunteer fighters, who had remained behind to protect the villages, but also civilians (700 families who had not yet escaped), were reported as still in the Sinjar area, and were forced by ISIL to abandon the last villages in their control, Dhoula and Bork, and retreat to the Sinjar Mountains.

Forced conversion 
In an article by The Washington Post, it was stated that an estimated 7,000 Yazidis had been forced to convert to "the Islamic State group's harsh interpretation of Islam". Yazidi boys were taken to Raqqa, Syria to be trained to fight for ISIL, with some being forced to fight as U.S.-led forces closed in on the group.

Return of the Yazidi population 

Following ISIL's retreat from Iraqi and Kurdish forces in the region during late 2017 campaigns, both governments laid claim to the area. The Yazidi population, with only about 15% returning to Sinjar during the period, was caught in the political crossfire. Yazidis returned to an abandoned town of crumbling buildings, leftover IEDs and the remains of those killed during the massacre.

In November 2017, a mass grave of about 70 people was uncovered and a month later in December, another mass grave was discovered holding about 90 victims.

Thousands are still missing. To aid in the search, local business owners use their network of contacts to locate people. Former captives use their contacts to buy back Yazidi women sold into sex slavery and return them to their family. This additionally prevents their organs from being sold on the black market, each of which, according to an Islamic State informant, can be sold for $60,000 - $70,000.

Releases of Yazidi captives 
In January 2015, about 200 Yazidis were released by ISIL. Kurdish military officials believed they were released because they were a burden. On 8 April 2015, 216 Yazidis, with the majority being children and elderly, were released by ISIL after being held captive for about eight months. Their release occurred following an offensive by U.S.-led air assaults and pressure from Iraqi ground forces who were pushing northward and in the process of retaking Tikrit. According to General Hiwa Abdullah, a peshmerga commander in Kirkuk, those released were in poor health with signs of abuse and neglect visible.

In March 2016, Iraqi security forces managed to free a group of Yazidi women held hostage by ISIL in a special operation behind ISILs lines in Mosul.

In March 2016, the militant group Kurdistan Workers' Party managed to free 51 Yazidis held hostages by ISIL in an operation called 'Operation Vengeance for Martyrs of Shilo' Three Kurdistan Workers' Party guerrillas died during the operation.

In April 2016, the Kurdistan Workers' Party with the Sinjar Resistance Units managed to free another 53 Yazidis held hostages by ISIL.

Classification as a genocide 

Many international organisations, governments and parliaments, as well as groups have classified ISIL's treatment of the Yazidis as genocide, and condemned it as such. The Genocide of Yazidis has been officially recognized by several bodies of the United Nations and the European Parliament.Some states have recognized it as well, including the National Assembly of Armenia, the Australian parliament, the British Parliament, the Canadian parliament, and the United States House of Representatives. Multiple individual human rights activists such as Nazand Begikhani and Dr. Widad Akrawi have also advocated for this view.

In 2017, CNN journalists Jomana Karadsheh and Chris Jackson interviewed former Yazidi captives and exclusively filmed the Daesh Criminal Investigations Unit (DCIU), a team of Iraqi Kurdish and western investigators who have been operating secretly in Northern Iraq, for more than two years, collecting evidence of ISIS’ war crimes.

 United Nations: 
 In a March 2015 report, the persecution of the Yazidi people was qualified as a genocide by the Office of the United Nations High Commissioner for Human Rights (UNHCR). The organization cited the numerous atrocities such as forced religious conversion and sexual slavery as being parts of an overall malicious campaign.
 In August 2017, the Independent International Commission of Inquiry on the Syrian Arab Republic of the United Nations Human Rights Council (UNHRC) stated that 'ISIL committed the crime of genocide by seeking to destroy the Yazidis through killings, sexual slavery, enslavement, torture, forcible displacement, the transfer of children and measures intended to prohibit the birth of Yazidi children.' It added that the genocide was ongoing, and stating that the international community still must recognize the detrimental effects of the genocide. The Commission wrote that, while some countries may choose to overlook the idea of the genocide, the atrocities need to be understood and the international community needs to bring the killings to an end. 
 In 2018, the Security Council team enforced the idea of a new accountability team that would collect evidence of the international crimes committed by the Islamic State. However, the international community has not been in full support of this idea, because it can sometimes oversee the crimes that other armed groups are involved in.
 On 10 May 2021, the United Nations Investigative Team to Promote Accountability for Crimes Committed by Da'esh/ISIL (UNITAD) determined that ISIL's actions in Iraq constituted genocide.

 Council of Europe: On 27 January 2016, the Parliamentary Assembly of the Council of Europe adopted a resolution stating: "individuals who act in the name of the terrorist entity which calls itself 'Islamic State' (Daesh) ... have perpetrated acts of genocide and other serious crimes punishable under international law. States should act on the presumption that Daesh commits genocide and should be aware that this entails action under the 1948 United Nations Convention on the Prevention and Punishment of the Crime of Genocide." However, it did not identify victims.

 European Union: On 4 February 2016, the European Parliament unanimously passed a resolution to recognise 'that the so-called 'ISIS/Daesh' is committing genocide against Christians and Yazidis, and other religious and ethnic minorities, who do not agree with the so-called 'ISIS/Daesh' interpretation of Islam, and that this therefore entails action under the 1948 United Nations Convention on the Prevention and Punishment of the Crime of Genocide.' Additionally, it called for those who intentionally committed atrocities for ethnic or religious reasons to be brought to justice for violating international law, and committing crimes against humanity, and genocide.

 United States: The United States Department of State has formally recognised the Yazidi genocide in areas under the control of ISIS in 2016 and 2017. On 14 March 2016, the United States House of Representatives voted unanimously 393-0 that violent actions performed against Yazidis, Christians, Shia and other groups by ISIL were acts of genocide. Days later on 17 March 2016, United States Secretary of State John Kerry declared that the violence initiated by ISIL against the Yazidis and others amounted to genocide.

 United Kingdom: On 20 April 2016, the House of Commons of the United Kingdom unanimously supported a motion to declare that the treatment of Yazidis and Christians by the Islamic State amounted to genocide, to condemn it as such, and to refer the issue to the UN Security Council. In doing so, Conservative MPs defied their own party's government, who had tried to dissuade them from making such a statement, because of the Foreign Office legal department's long-standing policy (dating back to the 1948 passing of the Genocide Convention) of refusing to give a legal description to potential war crimes. Foreign Office secretary Tobias Ellwood – who was jeered at and interrupted by MPs during his speech in the debate – stated that he personally believed genocide had taken place, but that it was not up to politicians to make that determination, but to the courts. Furthermore, on 23 March 2017, the regional devolved Scottish Parliament adopted a motion stating: '[The Scottish Parliament] recognises and condemns the genocide perpetrated against the Yezidi people by Daesh [ISIS]; acknowledges the great human suffering and loss that have been inflicted by bigotry, brutality and religious intolerance, [and] further acknowledges and condemns the crimes perpetrated by Daesh against Muslims, Christians, Arabs, Kurds and all of the religious and ethnic communities of Iraq and Syria; welcomes the actions of the US Congress, the European Parliament, the French Senate, the UN and others in formally recognising the genocide'.
 Canada: On 25 October 2016, the House of Commons of Canada unanimously supported a motion tabled by MP Michelle Rempel Garner (CPC) to recognise that ISIS was committing genocide against the Yazidi people, to acknowledge that ISIS still kept many Yazidi women and girls captive as sex slaves, to support and take action on a recent UN commission report, and provide asylum to Yazidi women and girls within 120 days.
 France: On 6 December 2016, the French Senate unanimously approved a resolution stating that acts committed by the Islamic State against "the Christian and Yazidi populations, other minorities and civilians" were "war crimes", "crimes against humanity", and constituted a "genocide". It also invited the government to "use all legal channels" to have these crimes recognised, and the perpetrators tried. The National Assembly adopted a similar resolution two days later (originally tabled on 25 May 2016 by Yves Fromion of The Republicans), with the Socialist, Ecologist and Republican group abstaining and the other groups approving.
 Armenia: In January 2018, the Armenian parliament recognised and condemned the 2014 genocide of Yazidis by the Islamic State, and called on the international community to conduct an international investigation into the events. 
 Israel: On 21 November 2018, a bill tabled by opposition MP Ksenia Svetlova (ZU) to recognise the Islamic State's killing of Yazidis as a genocide was defeated in a 58 to 38 vote in the Knesset. The coalition parties motivated their rejection of the bill by saying that the United Nations had not yet recognised it as a genocide.

 Iraq: On 1 March 2021, the Iraq parliament passed the Yazidi [Female] Survivors Bill which provides assistance to survivors and "determines the atrocities perpetrated by Daesh against the Yazidis, Turkmen, Christians and Shabaks to be genocide and crimes against humanity." The law provides compensation, measures for rehabilitation and reintegration, pensions, provision of land, housing, and education, and a quota in public sector employment. On 10 May 2021, the United Nations Investigative Team to Promote Accountability for Crimes Committed by Da'esh/ISIL (UNITAD) determined that ISIL's actions in Iraq constituted genocide.

 Belgium: On 30 June 2021, the Foreign Relations Commission of the Belgian Chamber of Representatives unanimously approved a resolution by opposition representatives Georges Dallemagne (cdH) and Koen Metsu (N-VA) to recognise ISIL's August 2014 massacre of thousands of Yazidi men and enslavement of thousands of Yazidi women and children as genocide. The resolution, which would likely also pass with overwhelming approval in the Chamber itself, called on the Belgian government to increase its efforts to support victims, and prosecute perpetrators (either at the International Criminal Court, or at a new ad hoc tribunal). On 17 July 2021, the Belgian parliament unanimously voted to recognize the suffering of the Yazidis at the hands of the Islamic State (ISIS) in 2014 as a genocide.

 Netherlands: On 6 July 2021, the Dutch House of Representatives unanimously passed a motion tabled by MP Anne Kuik (CDA) which recognised the crimes of Islamic State against the Yazidi population as a genocide and crimes against humanity.

 Germany: On 19 January 2023, the German Bundestag unanimously recognized the crimes against Yazidis as genocide. The resolution, which was jointly tabled by the government and the opposition, also calls for continous prosecution of the perpetrators and aid for rebuilding destroyed Yazidi villages.

Timeline table

International responses

ISIL's atrocities against Yazidis were strongly condemned by prominent Islamic scholars and Muslim organizations.

Western military intervention

On 7 August 2014, U.S. President Barack Obama ordered targeted airstrikes on IS militants and emergency air relief for the Yazidis. Airstrikes began on 8 August. (See American-led intervention in Iraq (2014–present)#Obama authorizes airstrikes.)

On 8 August 2014, the US asserted that the systematic destruction of the Yazidi people by the Islamic State was genocide.

President Barack Obama had authorized the attacks to protect Yazidis but also Americans and Iraqi minorities. President Obama gave an assurance that no troops would be deployed for combat. Along with the airstrikes of 9 August, the US airdropped 3,800 gallons of water and 16,128 MREs. Following these actions, the United Kingdom and France stated that they also would begin airdrops.

On 10 August 2014, at approximately 2:15 a.m. ET, the US carried out five additional airstrikes on armed vehicles and a mortar position, enabling 20,000–30,000 Yazidi Iraqis to flee into Syria and later be rescued by Kurdish forces. The Kurdish forces then provided shelter for the Yazidis in Dohuk.

On 13 August 2014, fewer than 20 United States Special Forces troops stationed in Irbil along with British Special Air Service troops visited the area near Mount Sinjar to gather intelligence and plan the evacuation of approximately 30,000 Yazidis still trapped on Mount Sinjar. One hundred and twenty-nine additional US military personnel were deployed to Irbil to assess and provide a report to President Obama. The United States Central Command also reported that a seventh airdrop was conducted and that to date, 114,000 meals and more than 35,000 gallons of water had been airdropped to the displaced Yazidis in the area.

In a statement on 14 August 2014, The Pentagon said that the 20 US personnel who had visited the previous day had concluded that a rescue operation was probably unnecessary since there was less danger from exposure or dehydration and the Yazidis were no longer believed to be at risk of attack from ISIL. Estimates also stated that 4,000 to 5,000 people remained on the mountain, with nearly half of which being Yazidi herders who lived there before the siege.

Kurdish officials and Yazidi refugees stated that thousands of young, elderly, and disabled individuals on the mountain were still vulnerable, with the governor of Kurdistan's Dahuk province, Farhad Atruchi, saying that the assessment was "not correct" and that although people were suffering, "the international community is not moving".

Humanitarian aid

30,000-40,000 Yazidis fled to Syria, 100,000 Yazidis took refuge in Kurdish controlled Zakho, Iraq. In Syria, the UNHCR provided material and transportation to Yazidi refugees and local Syrian communities cooked them meals. Turkey initially took in 2,000 Yazidis refugees in Silopi, where they were provided food and medical care, but some refugees were turned back. The Turkish Disaster Relief Agency (AFAD) also set up refugee camps in Zakho, Iraq. By 31 August, Turkey reportedly hosted 16,000 Yazidi refugees. 

The US military air dropped food and water to Yazidis trapped on Mount Sinjar. Today's Zaman reported that Turkey also airdropped humanitarian aid to Yazidi refugees within Iraq.

International bodies
 United Nations – On 13 August 2014, the United Nations declared the Yazidi crisis a highest-level "Level 3 Emergency", saying that the declaration "will facilitate mobilization of additional resources in goods, funds and assets to ensure a more effective response to the humanitarian needs of populations affected by forced displacements". On 19 March 2015, a United Nations panel concluded that ISIL "may have committed" genocide against the Yazidis with an investigation head, Suki Nagra, stating that the attacks on the Yazidis "were not just spontaneous or happened out of the blue, they were clearly orchestrated".
 Arab League – On 11 August 2014, the Arab League accused ISIL of committing crimes against humanity by persecuting the Yazidis.
 Defend International – On 6 September 2014, Defend International launched a worldwide campaign entitled "Save The Yazidis: The World Has To Act Now" to raise awareness about the tragedy of the Yazidis in Sinjar; coordinate activities related to intensifying efforts aimed at rescuing Yazidi and Christian women and girls captured by ISIL; provide a platform for discussion and the exchange of information on matters and activities relevant to securing the fundamental rights of the Yazidis, no matter where they reside; and building a bridge between potential partners and communities whose work is relevant to the campaign, including individuals, groups, communities, and organizations active in the areas of women's and girls' rights, inter alia, as well as actors involved in ending modern-day slavery and violence against women and girls.The U.S. Commission on International Religious Freedom (USCIRF) emphasized the continued threats against Yazidis and made calls for U.S. government action to support the human rights and religious freedom of the group in Iraq.

Prosecutions 
Amal Clooney of the Center for Justice & Accountability (CJA), represented five Yazidi women before the United States District Court for the Eastern District of Virginia against Umm Sayyaf seeking prosecution of Sayyaf for her role in their enslavement. In 2021, German courts convicted ISIS women for their involvement in the enslavement of Yazidi women. A report by the Yazidi Justice Committee covered the allegation of countries, Turkey, Syria, and Iraq, for failing to prevent and punish the genocide.

Resettlement 
United States Senators Amy Klobuchar and Lindsey Graham have called on United States President Joe Biden to help resettle Yazidi survivors of the Islamic State campaign of 2014-2017.

Yazidi retaliation against Arab neighbors 
According to a report by Amnesty International, on January 25, 2015, members of a Yazidi militia attacked two Arab villages (Jiri and Sibaya) in the Sinjar region of northern Iraq, killing 21 civilians. The gunmen also kidnapped 40 other residents, 17 of whom are still missing and presumed dead.

Representation in films 
 Sisters in Arms (2019 film)

See also

 2007 Yazidi communities bombings
 Al-Anfal Campaign
 Collaboration with ISIL 
 Genocide of Christians by the Islamic State
 Human rights in Islamic State-controlled territory
 It's On U
 Mass executions in ISIL-occupied Mosul
 Military intervention against ISIL 
 Persecution of Shias by ISIL
 Yazidism in Iraq

Further reading

References

External links
 The Islamic State, Vice News report (segment featuring Yazidi refugees starts at 39:50)
 

Genocides in Asia
Persecution of Yazidis by ISIL
Articles containing video clips
Contemporary slavery
Ethnic cleansing by the Islamic State of Iraq and the Levant
People executed for refusing to convert to Islam
Persecution of Yazidis in Iraq
Sexual slavery
Genocidal rape
Massacres of ethnic groups
People killed by the Islamic State of Iraq and the Levant
Racism in the Arab world
21st-century mass murder
Ethnic cleansing
Ethnic cleansing in Asia
Islam and slavery